Paul Dobson may refer to:
Paul Dobson (footballer) (born 1962), English footballer
Paul Dobson (actor), British-born Canadian voice actor
Paul Dobson (British Army soldier), British soldier, first NCO to be awarded the Military Cross
Paul Dobson (curler) (born 1979), Canadian curler